María Teresita del Valle Colombo de Acevedo (1957 – 3 May 2021) was an Argentine politician who was a Senator for the province Catamarca and a member of the Radical Civic Union, which itself formed part of the Civic and Social Front of Catamarca.

Biography
Colombo was born in San Fernando del Valle de Catamarca. She studied at the Universidad Nacional de Córdoba graduating in medicine, and studied politics as a postgraduate.

Colombo served as a provincial senator in Catamarca Province 1991–95. and was senate president 1994. She was elected to the Argentine Chamber of Deputies for 1997–2001 and became a senator in 2001. She was re-elected in 2003 for a six-year term, which expired on 10 December 2009.

Colombo died on 3 May 2021, at the age of 64, as a result of a thrombosis caused by her contagion from COVID-19.

References

External links
Senate profile

1957 births
2021 deaths
Women members of the Argentine Chamber of Deputies
Members of the Argentine Chamber of Deputies elected in Catamarca
Women members of the Argentine Senate
Members of the Argentine Senate for Catamarca
Radical Civic Union politicians
People from Catamarca Province
Deaths from the COVID-19 pandemic in Argentina
21st-century Argentine politicians
21st-century Argentine women politicians